Delhi Belly is a 2011 Indian action comedy film written by Akshat Verma and directed by Abhinay Deo. It stars Imran Khan, Kunaal Roy Kapur, Vir Das, Poorna Jagannathan and Shenaz Treasurywala. It is a Hinglish-language film, with seventy percent of the dialogue in English and thirty percent in Hindi. The film is produced by Aamir Khan Productions and UTV Motion Pictures. The theatrical trailer of the film premiered with Aamir Khan's Dhobi Ghat on 21 January 2011 while the film was released on 1 July 2011, along with a Hindi dubbed version. The film was given an 'A' certificate for its profanity, intense violence and sexual content. The film was remade in Tamil as Settai.

Plot
The story revolves around three roommates, journalist Tashi, photographer Nitin Berry and cartoonist Arup, leading an unkempt and debt-ridden life in a shady apartment in Delhi. Tashi's ditzy fiancée, Sonia, is an air hostess who agrees to deliver a package for Vladimir Dragunsky to Somayajulu, without realizing its contents or that Somayajulu is a gangster. Sonia asks Tashi to deliver the package. Tashi, in turn, asks Nitin to do so. But Nitin is unable to do so as he is suffering from diarrhea. Nitin hands Sonia's package to Arup for delivery to Somayajulu, along with a package containing his stool sample for delivery to Nitin's doctor. Arup mixes up the two bags. Somayajulu, furious, tortures Vladimir to find his package.

Meanwhile, Nitin photographs his landlord Manish with a prostitute. He sends an envelope with the photographs to his landlord to blackmail him. Tashi is with Sonia, when his colleague Menaka calls him on the pretext of work. When he reaches the place he realizes that it is just a party and Menaka called him just to have fun. Menaka's ex-husband Rajeev sees them together and punches Tashi in the eye in a fit of jealousy. Tashi retaliates and knocks Rajeev out. As Tashi and Menaka leave they are chased by a furious Rajeev and his friends who shoot at them. The duo barely manages to escape.

Vladimir informs Somayajulu that the mix-up must have been caused by Sonia as she didn't know what she was carrying in the package. Somayajulu calls Sonia, informs her about the mix-up and asks her to give him the address of the person who had delivered the package. When Tashi arrives into his apartment, he walks into Somayajulu who has Arup standing on a stool with a noose around his neck. On hard interrogation, Somayajulu discovers the mix-up and realizes that the package must be with Nitin's doctor.

Nitin gets the package from his doctor's office, wherein Somayajulu finds his thirty diamonds hidden inside. Upon recovering his booty, he orders his henchmen to kill the three roommates. One of them is about to shoot Tashi, when another kicks the stool on which Arup was standing to hang him. Luckily for the roommates, the ceiling of the apartment collapses, since it can't take Arup's weight. The cave-in knocks out Somayajulu and his men, leaving one with broken arms. Tashi, Arup and Nitin escape with the diamonds and spend the night at Menaka's place. The next day they sell the diamonds to a local jeweller.

As the roommates prepare to get out of town with the money, they get a call from Somayajulu who has kidnapped Sonia. He threatens to kill her if they don't return the diamonds. The trio tries to buy back the diamonds from the jeweller, who demands double the sale amount.

Without the money, Tashi comes up with a plan. Nitin, Arup, Tashi and Menaka disguise themselves in burqas and rob the jeweller, leaving him the bag of money. They flee in Tashi's car with the police on their tail and go to the hotel where Somayajulu is holding Sonia. As they are about to make the exchange with Somayajulu, the police arrive at the hotel room where a shoot-out between the police and Somayajulu's gang.

Nitin, Arup, Tashi, Sonia and Vladimir who had hit the floor during the gunfight, are left as the only survivors. Menaka, who by now realises that she likes Tashi, is upset to learn about his engagement and walks away from him. Tashi breaks off his engagement to Sonia. Later, it is revealed that Nitin did not return the cash to the jewellery store owner, and had kept most of the money for himself (whereupon he abandons blackmailing the landlord). The film ends when Menaka comes to the roommates' apartment to return Tashi's car's hubcap lost while escaping from Rajeev. Tashi jumps into her car through the open window and kisses her passionately.

Producer-actor Aamir Khan is seen dancing in a song and dance performance as the credits start rolling.

Cast

 Imran Khan as Tashi Malhotra / Tashi Dorjee Lhatoo
 Kunaal Roy Kapur as Nitin Berry
 Vir Das as Arup
 Rahul Singh as Rajeev Khanna (Menaka's Ex-husband)
 Poorna Jagannathan as Menaka Vashisht
 Shenaz Treasurywala as Sonia Mehra
 Raju Kher as Zubin Mehra (Sonia's Father)
 Vijay Raaz as Somayajulu
 John Gabriel as Lucky (Somayajulu's Henchman)
 Lushin Dubey as Mrs. Mehra (Sonia's Mother)
 Paresh Ganatra as Manish Chand Jain
 Rahul Pendkalkar as Prateek Jain
 Sanjay Taneja as DIG Phool Chand Jain (Manish's Brother)
 Rajendra Sethi as Sudhir Adlakha (the jeweller)
 Pradeep Kabra as Brajesh (Somayajulu's Henchman)
 Dharmendar Singh as Bunty (Somayajulu's Henchman)
 Kim Bodnia as Vladimir Dragunsky
 Anusha Dhandekar as VJ Sophaya
 Bugs Bhargava as Swapan Bannerjee (Arup's boss)
 Aamir Khan as Disco Fighter (Guest Appearance in song "I Hate You (Like I Love You)") also as the producer

Production

Development
This film was written by Akshat Verma, a Los Angeles based writer, who first wrote the screenplay as a part of his studies at Screenwriting programme at UCLA, under the title Say Cheese. Subsequently, after he lost his job as a copywriter in the US, around 2005, he revived the script. Akshat had to compile fifteen drafts before the movie was released. It took him more than three years to finish writing the story. He visited Mumbai, along with Jim Furgele, to unsuccessfully pitch the film to various film producers, and eventually left after submitting a draft to Aamir Khan Productions. The script was thrown into a pile of scripts in Aamir Khan's office, where his wife Kiran Rao randomly found it and shared it with him. Aamir then contacted the writer, who was initially hesitant that it might ruin the "clean, family entertainment" tag of Aamir Khan Productions; however, Aamir had produced two A-certificate films before, Peepli Live and Dhobi Ghat.

Filming
Shooting for the film began in August 2008 in Delhi and finished in mid 2009. The film was stuck in editing that led to a 2 year delay. Initially, Aamir was to spearhead the editing but he got busy with his own films.

Casting
Initially, Ranbir Kapoor and Chitrangada Singh were to star in the film. After both of them backed out, Aamir signed his nephew Imran Khan for the lead role following the tremendous success of his debut film Jaane Tu Ya Jaane Na.Indian comedian Vir Das was also signed to star in the film. According to director Abhinay Deo, "Delhi Belly is an ensemble piece. It's not a film about Imran Khan. He is only one of the several protagonists. There are others whose characters are just as important. There is Kunal Roy Kapoor, Vir Das and Poorna Jagannathan, an Indian actress from LA".

Release
On 3 July 2011, the Government of Nepal banned the screening of the movie citing the reluctance by the cinema halls to remove offensive scenes from the film. However, Nepal's censors later agreed to clear the film for viewing by theatre goers above 16 years. An offending scene showing one of the protagonists, played by Kunaal Roy Kapur, visiting a brothel, was cut and some expletives in two scenes were muted. The film was selected for being screened in the Harvard Business School and Harvard Kennedy School as a part of the Harvard India Conference 2012. Director Abhinay Deo was invited as a guest.

The theatrical trailer of the film premiered with Aamir Khan's Dhobi Ghat on 21 January 2011 while the film was released on 1 July 2011, along with a Hindi dubbed version.

The film was edited once again for its television premiere later in 2011. The Central Board of Film Certification ordered 75 cuts before granting it a U/A certificate.

Critical reception
The film received critical acclaim. Nikhat Kazmi of the Times of India rated the film with four out of five stars, and said – "All in all, Delhi Belly is a fine example of how the brightest and the boldest, when they pool in their talent, can create a film that is guaranteed to give you your money's worth, even as it re-writes all the moth-balled rules of an ageing industry. Enjoy the experience." Pratim D. Gupta of The Telegraph called Delhi Belly "an insanely funny ensemble comedy" and praised writer Akshat Verma's "original screenplay, which knows the difference between physical comedy and slapstick humour." Behindwoods gave a score of three and a half stars and said that the film was "Only for those with a cast iron stomach." further citing "In conclusion, it may be said that Delhi Belly caters to a section of the populace that is cool when shit happens." Taran Adarsh of Bollywood Hungama rated the movie with four and a half stars and wrote – "Eventually, Delhi Belly works big time predominantly for the reason that it's a pioneering motion picture, an incredible film that dares to pierce into an untapped and brand new terrain. The unblemished, racy screenplay coupled with super performances and a chart-busting musical score will make it a winner all the way." Mihir Fadnavis of Daily News and Analysis called the script "hilarious" and "bitingly perceptive" and gave the film four out of five stars, saying "I haven't had this much fun at the movies in a long time". Mathures Paul of The Statesman gave the film four out of five stars, and wrote, "It's a fashionable film for fashionable youth." Raja Sen of Rediff gave the movie three stars out of a possible five, saying "Delhi Belly has a tight, pacy plot which has lots of satisfying little set-ups and pay-offs". Rajeev Masand of CNN-IBN gave the film three and a half out of five stars, saying "Delhi Belly is a filthy comic thriller that works because it's a smartly paced wild-ride". He also praised Vijay Raaz's performance, saying that the gangster's role had been "played wonderfully".

The movie also received high praise from critics outside India. Lisa Tsering of The Hollywood Reporter called it a "Sexy, filthy and thoroughly entertaining comedy" and that it "marks a welcome shift in contemporary Indian cinema." She however pointed out that Aamir Khan "overstays his welcome" in his cameo at the end of the film, and that "a momentary glimpse would have had more impact." Kevin Thomas of the Los Angeles Times said that "Akshat Verma's script is imaginative and funny, the film's stars are engaging and "Delhi Belly" adds up to pleasing escapist fare." Peter Bradshaw of The Guardian also praised the film, saying that "The sheer daftness and goofiness of this Bollywood comedy-farce makes it likable."

Other reviewers, however, deplored the scatological basis of most of the humour and the hackneyed scenarios in the movie. Shubhra Gupta of The Indian Express had this to say in her review: "After a while, the continuous bad tummy rumbles and farts, and the non-stop cussing, wears thin. And please, wearing burqas as a disguise is not the only way you can have characters on the run in the grungier parts of town, even if you overlay the chase with the ultra-clever, super-catchy Bhaag D K Bose ditty. There are, believe us, other ways."

Box office
The film opened very well at the box office. It grossed  in the first week of screening all around India and US$1.6 million overseas. The film grossed  in India by the end of its third week, being declared a super hit. Delhi Belly grossed  worldwide.

Remakes 
Delhi Belly was remade in Tamil as Settai released on 5 April 2013.

Soundtrack

The music of the film was composed by Ram Sampath while the lyrics were penned by Amitabh Bhattacharya, Munna Dhiman, Ram Sampath, Akshat Verma and Chetan Shashital. The song "Bhaag D.K. Bose" created controversy upon its release. 'D K Bose, D K Bose,' juxtaposed and sung at a quick pace forms a popular expletive in North India. Akshat Verma came up with the idea of using the phrase 'D K Bose'. Abhinay Deo and Aamir Khan gave their nod to the song as they felt the catch phrase went with the young and irreverent theme of the film.

Track listing

Accolades

References

External links

 
 
 
 

2011 films
2010s Hindi-language films
2011 action comedy films
2011 black comedy films
English-language Indian films
Films scored by Ram Sampath
Films about drugs
Films set in Delhi
Films shot in Delhi
Indian action comedy films
Indian black comedy films
Indian buddy films
UTV Motion Pictures films
2011 multilingual films
Indian multilingual films
2011 directorial debut films
Films directed by Abhinay Deo